

The Cyclades

The following islands are part of the Greek Cyclades:

The Dodecanese Islands

The following Aegean islands are part of the Greek Dodecanese islands:

The North Aegean Islands

The North Aegean Islands include the following:

See also List of islands of Turkey#Aydın Province, List of islands of Turkey#Balıkesir Province, and List of islands of Turkey#Çanakkale Province for additional Turkish island in the North Aegean.

The Saronic Islands

The following Aegean islands are part of the Saronic Islands:

The Sporades

The following Aegean islands are part of the Sporades:

Creten and Ionian Sea islands

The following islands are part of the Cretan islands of the Aegean Sea and the Ionian Sea.

Euboea and surrounding islands

The following island are on or near the island of Euboea:

Notes

See also
List of islands of Greece
List of islands in the Mediterranean
List of islands
List of islands of Turkey#Aegean Sea islands

References 

Aegean

el:Νησιά Αιγαίου Πελάγους
jv:Daftar pulo ing Segara Aegea
tr:Ege Adaları
zh:爱琴海诸岛